Mieres is a village and municipality in the comarca of Garrotxa, in the province of Girona, in Catalonia, Spain.

References

External links
 Municipal website
 Government data pages 

Municipalities in Garrotxa